Danforth Township is one of twenty-six townships in Iroquois County, Illinois, USA.  As of the 2010 census, its population was 928 and it contained 385 housing units.

History
Danforth Township was named for George M. Danforth, an early settler. Danforth Township formed from Douglas Township and Ashkum Township sometime before 1921.

Geography

Cities, towns, villages
 Danforth

Cemeteries
The township contains Bardon Cemetery.

Major highways
  Interstate 57
  U.S. Route 45

Airports and landing strips
 Classen Field RLA Airport
 Wilken Airport

Demographics

School districts
 Iroquois West Community Unit School District 10

Political districts
 Illinois' 15th congressional district
 State House District 75
 State House District 105
 State Senate District 38
 State Senate District 53

References
 
 United States Census Bureau 2007 TIGER/Line Shapefiles
 United States National Atlas

External links
 City-Data.com
 Illinois State Archives

Townships in Iroquois County, Illinois
Townships in Illinois